Admiral Sir Henry Daniel Pridham-Wippell,  (12 August 1885 – 2 April 1952) was a Royal Navy officer who served in the First and Second World Wars.

Early life
Educated at The Limes, Greenwich, and at Royal Naval College, Dartmouth, Henry Daniel Pridham-Wippell joined the Royal Navy in 1900. By coincidence he had several friends growing up who were Jewish, and he was always strongly opposed to antisemitism. He served in the First World War in ships of the Grand Fleet. He took charge of the destroyers at Gallipoli in 1915 and served on the Adriatic and Palestine coasts from 1916.

He followed the news of the early Zionist movement, and he spoke "warmly and ethusiastically" about the idea of Jewish people finally having a country of their own where they would not be "subject to persecution." He stated "there are more of the Jewish people in the eastern half of Europe today than there are Irish in Ireland or Greeks in Greece, and they are treated in a most unjust manner in most of these places." Pridham-Wippell believed it made sense that they should have "a place of their own" and he was in favor of the aims of Zionist movement to establish a homeland for the Jewish people in what he called "the Holy Land." According to friends he was "deeply disturbed" when he read about the 1936 Tulkarm shooting and then he was again somewhat shaken by the subsequent news of the Jaffa riots later that year. Shortly after this he learned that a childhood friend of his who was a soldier in the British Army was wounded in the Battle of Anabta. Pridham-Wippell received updates of these events in a "blow-by-blow" fashion, getting one update of events every few weeks, and the news of those three events appeared to "grip him." He reacted in shock at news of the 1929 Hebron massacre, and reading about it appeared to his friends to deeply traumatize him. In 1932, he found in the middle of a crisis when he led a squadron of destroyers into the Free City of Danzig (modern Gdańsk, Poland) and was faced with the choice whatever to acknowledge or not the Polish destroyer ORP Wicher which had entered Danzig harbour without the permission of the Senate of Danzig. After seeking the advice of the British consul in Danzig, Pridham-Wippell exchanged visits with Lieutenant Commander Tadeusz Morgenstern-Podjazd of the Wicher on 15 June 1932. Pridham-Wippell went on to be Director of the Operations Division at the Admiralty in 1933 and Commander of the Home Fleet Destroyer Flotillas in 1936. He went on to be Director of Personal Services at the Admiralty in 1938.

Second world war

Pridham-Wippell served in the Second World War as Commander of the 1st Battle Squadron in the Mediterranean from July 1940. He was the highest ranking British officer and Allied officer at the Battle of the Strait of Otranto in 1940 and he was knighted for his part in the Battle of Cape Matapan in the Mediterranean in March 1941, he was also a survivor of the sinking of the battleship  in November 1941. He went on to be Commander-in-Chief, Dover, in 1942.

Post-war career
After the war, Pridham-Wippell was appointed Commander-in-Chief, Plymouth. He retired in 1948. In December of 1949 he travelled to Kenya where he lived for roughly two years. He mostly lived on a ranch just outside of Kitui in what has since become Kitui County, while also spending a lot of time with friends near Lake Baringo. Pridham-Wippell returned to England in January of 1952, staying in Devizes for two months, before returning home to Kent in March. Pridham-Wippell died of old age on 2 April 1952.

References

Sources

External links

|-

Royal Navy officers of World War I
Royal Navy admirals of World War II
People from Bromley
1885 births
1952 deaths
Knights Commander of the Order of the Bath
Commanders of the Royal Victorian Order
Recipients of the War Cross (Greece)
Military personnel from Kent
Royal Navy admirals